The European LC Championships 1995 in aquatics were staged in Vienna, Austria from 22–27 August. The competition, organised by the LEN, was held in a temporary pool in the Prater Stadium. The aquatics championships featured contests in swimming, open water swimming, diving, synchronized swimming (women only) and water polo. It was the third time the European Aquatics Championships were held in Vienna, after 1950 and 1974.

Medal table

Swimming

Men's events

Women's events

Open water swimming

Men's events

Women's events

Diving

Men's events

Women's events

Synchronized swimming

Water polo

Men's team event

Women's team event

External links 
EUROPEAN SWIMMING CHAMPIONSHIPS (MEN) (1987-2004) at Gbrathletics.com
EUROPEAN SWIMMING CHAMPIONSHIPS (WOMEN) (1987-2004) at Gbrathletics.com

 
European Aquatics Championships, 1995
S
LEN European Aquatics Championships
International aquatics competitions hosted by Austria
Sports competitions in Vienna
Swimming competitions in Austria
Diving competitions in Austria
1990s in Vienna
August 1995 sports events in Europe